David Cancola (born 23 October 1996) is an Austrian footballer who plays as a defensive midfielder for Ross County.

Club career
He made his Austrian Football Bundesliga debut for FK Austria Wien on 20 August 2017 in a game against SV Mattersburg.

On 10 September 2020, Cancola moved abroad for the first time, joining Slovan Liberec on a free transfer.

Cancola signed for Scottish Premiership side Ross County on 23 July 2021.

Career statistics

References

External links

 

1996 births
Living people
Austrian footballers
FK Austria Wien players
Austrian Football Bundesliga players
SC Wiener Neustadt players
TSV Hartberg players
2. Liga (Austria) players

Association football midfielders
Ross County F.C. players
Austrian expatriate footballers
Expatriate footballers in Scotland
Austrian expatriates in Scotland
FC Slovan Liberec players
Expatriate footballers in the Czech Republic
Austrian expatriates in the Czech Republic
Scottish Professional Football League players